Claus Høj Jensen is a Danish sailor and sail maker. He is competing in the Dragon, H-boat, Yngling and OK classes. He is the son of Poul Richard Høj Jensen.

H-Boat
Claus Høj Jensen has won the Danish championship in H-boat 9 times. Their team spinnaker carries a golden star for each World championship they have won.

References

Danish male sailors (sport)
Dragon class sailors
H-boat class sailors
Yngling class sailors
1970 births
Living people